The Beaufort District is an administrative district in the Malaysian state of Sabah, part of the Interior Division which includes the districts of Beaufort, Keningau, Kuala Penyu, Nabawan, Sipitang, Tambunan and Tenom. The population of Beaufort is composed mainly of Bisaya, Brunei Malays, Kadazan-Dusuns, Lun Bawang/Lun Dayeh, Muruts and Chinese (mainly Hakkas). Bisaya are the majority ethnic, and the population is scattered around the town. The capital of the district is in Beaufort Town.

Etymology 
The district was named after the former British North Borneo Governor Leicester Paul Beaufort.

History 
The area of Beaufort was discovered by the British in 1898 during the administration of the North Borneo Chartered Company.

Demographics 

According to the 2010 census, the population of the district was 64,350 inhabitants. 
The main indigenous people of Beaufort are Bisaya, Brunei Malay, Kedayan and minority of Murut and Lun Bawang/Lundayeh.

The population is divided among the larger communities and the total area of the district as follows:

Gallery

See also 
 Districts of Malaysia

References

Further reading

External links 

  Beaufort District Council
  Beaufort District Office